Aminabad (also Romanized as Amīnābād; also known as Amīrābād) is a village in Valiabad Rural District, in the Central District of Qarchak County, Tehran Province, Iran. At the 2006 census, its population was 1,182, in 276 families.

References 

Populated places in Qarchak County